The following are the winners of the 18th annual (1991) Origins Award, presented at Origins 1992:

External links
  1991 Origins Awards Winners

1991 awards
1991 awards in the United States
Origins Award winners